Veneri al sole is a 1965 Italian comedy film directed by Marino Girolami.

Cast
Carlo Delle Piane as Oreste (segment "Intrigo al mare")
Gloria Paul as Jenny (segment "Intrigo al mare")
Umberto D'Orsi as L'inseguitore (segment "Intrigo al mare")
Ennio Girolami	as Mario Giorgetti (segment "Intrigo al mare")
Giampiero Littera as Jimmy (segment "Intrigo al mare")
Enzo Andronico as Il commissario (segment "Intrigo al mare")
Marco Mariani (segment "Intrigo al mare")
Edy Biagetti as Una bagnante (segment "Intrigo al mare")
Franco Franchi as Francesco Macrì (segment "Una domenica a Fregene")
Ciccio Ingrassia as Francesco Pattané (segment "Una domenica a Fregene")
Franca Polesello as L'amica di Francesco (segment "Una domenica a Fregene")
Nietta Zocchi as La madre di Concettina (segment "Una domenica a Fregene")
Elena Belletti as Assuntina (segment "Una domenica a Fregene")
Ermelinda De Felice as Concettina (segment "Una domenica a Fregene") (as Linda De Felice)
Raimondo Vianello as Raimondo Raimondi (segment "Come conquistare le donne")

External links
 

1965 films
Italian comedy films
1960s Italian-language films
1965 comedy films
Films directed by Marino Girolami
Films scored by Carlo Savina
1960s Italian films